Kuruch-Karan (Qoros-Qaran) is a rural locality (a selo) in Starokuruchevsky Selsoviet, Bakalinsky District, Bashkortostan, Russia. The population was 42 as of 2010. There is 1 street.

Geography 
Kuruch-Karan is located 20 km southeast of Bakaly (the district's administrative centre) by road. Bugabashevo is the nearest rural locality.

References 

Rural localities in Bakalinsky District